The Regiment "Genova Cavalleria" (4th) is a cavalry unit of the Italian Army based in Palmanova in Friuli Venezia Giulia. The regiment is the highest decorated and oldest cavalry regiment of the Italian Army and the only army unit, whose anniversary commemorates a pre-Risorgimento event. The regiment is the reconnaissance unit of the Cavalry Brigade "Pozzuolo del Friuli".

History

Formation 
On 26 January 1683 the Regiment Dragoons of His Royal Highness was formed on orders of the Duke of Savoy Victor Amadeus II. The regiment fielded 18 officers and 300 Dragoons, which were grouped into six companies. Due to the colour of their uniforms the regiment was nicknamed "Dragons Bleus".

Cabinet Wars 
Between 1690 and 1697 the regiment participated in the Nine Years' War against the Kingdom of France. The regiment fought in 1690 in the Battle of Staffarda, in 1693 in the Battle of Marsaglia, and in 1696 in the Siege of Valenza. The same year the companies were increased to eight.

In 1701 Duke Victor Amadeus II joined the War of the Spanish Succession and the regiment fought in the Siege of Guastalla and then in 1706 in the Siege of Turin. The same year the companies were increased to ten. In 1713 the war ended with the Peace of Utrecht, which transferred the Kingdom of Sicily and parts of the Duchy of Milan to Savoy. In October 1713 Victor Amadeus II and his wife, Anne Marie d'Orléans, travelled from Nice to Palermo, where the king and queen were crowned in the cathedral of Palermo on 24 December 1713. Consequently the regiment was renamed Regiment Dragoons of His Majesty. With the war's conclusion the regiment was reduced to eight companies, which were grouped into four squadrons, while the ninth and tenth company were transferred to the Regiment Dragoons of Piedmont.

In July 1718 Spain landed troops on Sicily and tried to recover the Kingdom of Sicily from Savoy rule. On 2 August 1718 Britain, France, Austria, and the Dutch Republic formed an alliance to defeat Spain in the War of the Quadruple Alliance. The war ended with the 1720 Treaty of The Hague, which restored the position prior to 1717, but with Savoy and Austria exchanging Sardinia and Sicily.

In 1733 King Charles Emmanuel III joined the War of the Polish Succession on the French-Spanish side. In December 1733 the regiment was increased to ten companies for the war. In 1734 the regiment fought in the Battle of Guastalla against Austrian forces.

In 1742 King Charles Emmanuel III joined the War of the Austrian Succession on the Austrian side and the Dragoons of His Majesty fought in 1744 in the Battle of Casteldelfino and on 10 August 1746 in the Battle of Rottofreddo the regiment captured several flags of the Duke of Anjou's regiment.

In July 1774 the Regiment Dragoons of His Majesty ceded two of its companies to help form the Regiment Dragoons of Chablais. Afterwards the Dragoons of His Majesty consisted of eight companies grouped in four squadrons.

French Revolutionary Wars 
In 1792 King Victor Amadeus III joined the War of the First Coalition against the French Republic. From 1792 to 1796 the regiment fought against the French Army of Italy. In March 1796 Napoleon Bonaparte arrived in Italy and took command of the French forces, with which he defeated the Royal Sardinian Army in the Montenotte campaign within a month. During the Montenotte campaign Napoleon's forces pursued the Sardinian forces, which on 21 April 1796 stood and fought the Battle of Mondovì against the French. During this battle the regiment charged the French dragoons and hussars on the Bricchetto hill, allowing the Sardinian infantry to retreat from the battlefield. King Victor Amadeus III awarded the regiment for this charge with two Gold Medals of Military Valour as "one is not enough to reward so much valour".

However already one week later, on 28 April 1796, King Victor Amadeus III had to sign the Armistice of Cherasco and on 15 May 1796 the Treaty of Paris, which forced Sardinia out of the First Coalition. Victor Amadeus III also had to cede the Duchy of Savoy and the County of Nice to France. On 16 October 1796 Victor Amadeus III died and his eldest son Charles Emmanuel IV ascended the throne. On 26 October 1796 King Charles Emmanuel IV ordered to reduce the Kingdom's cavalry forces and the Dragoons of His Majesty were reduced to four squadrons. On the same date the company level was abolished.

In fall 1798 France invaded the remaining territories of King Charles Emmanuel IV. On 6 December 1798 French forces occupied Turin and on 8 December 1798 Charles Emmanuel IV was forced to sign a document of abdication, which also ordered his former subjects to recognise French laws and his troops to obey the orders of the French Army. Charles Emmanuel IV went into exile on Sardinia, while his former territories became the Piedmontese Republic. On 9 December 1798 the Sardinian troops were released from their oath of allegiance to the King and sworn to the Piedmontese Republic. The same month the Regiment Dragoons of His Majesty was renamed 1st Cavalry Regiment.

In January 1799 the 1st Cavalry Regiment received two squadrons from the disbanded 2nd Cavalry Regiment, the successor of the Regiment Dragoons of the Queen. At the same time the 1st Cavalry Regiment was renamed 1st Piedmontese Dragoons Regiment. In spring 1799 the regiment fought for the French in the War of the Second Coalition against the Austrians. On 5 April 1799 the regiment fought in the Battle of Magnano, which the Austrians won, forcing the French out of Italy. With the French retreat the Piedmontese Republic dissolved and the 1st Piedmontese Dragoons Regiment, like all regiments of the Piedmontese Republic, was disbanded in May 1799.

Restauration 
On 11 April 1814 Napoleon abdicated and on 20 May 1814 King Victor Emmanuel I returned from exile in Sardinia to Turin. On 24 May 1814 Victor Emmanuel I ordered to reform the cavalry regiments disbanded in 1799, including the Regiment Dragoons of His Majesty, which was renamed Regiment Dragoons of the King. On 1 January 1815 the regiment consisted of six squadrons grouped into three divisions.

Victor Emmanuel I abolished all the freedoms granted by the Napoleonic Codices and restored a fiercely oppressive rule, which led in March 1821 to a liberal revolution in Piedmont. There cavalry regiments sided with the revolutionaries against Victor Emmanuel I, who abdicated in favor of his brother Charles Felix on 13 March 1821. Charles Felix suppressed the revolution with the help of Austrian troops and on 1 August 1821 the three cavalry regiments, which had sided with the revolutionaries were disbanded: Regiment Dragoons of the King, Regiment Dragoons of the Queen, Regiment Chevau-légers of the King. On the same date with one detachment of the Dragoons of the King, which had remained loyal, the Regiment "Dragoons of Génévois" was formed in Pinerolo. The new regiment retained the awards and traditions of its predecessor, including the two Gold Medals of Military Valour. The regiment also received the personnel of the Regiment Dragoons of the Queen, which had remained loyal.

The Génévois was a dukedom surrounding the city of Geneva and Duke of Génévois was one of the titles of Charles Felix. A Regiment "Dragoons of Génévois" had already been active between 1689 and 1774, when it was renamed Regiment of the King's Light Horses (}. Disbanded in May 1799 the regiment was reformed in 1814 as Regiment Chevau-légers of the King and disbanded on 1 August 1821. The new Regiment "Dragoons of Génévois" consisted of six squadrons grouped in three divisions.

On 24 December 1828 the Dragoons of Génévois provided some of its personnel to help form the new Regiment "Dragoni di Piemonte". On 3 January 1832 the regiment was renamed Regiment "Genova Cavalleria" after the Duchy of Genoa, which had been gained by the Kingdom of Sardinia after the fall of Napoleon.

Italian Wars of Independence 
In 1848-49 the regiment participated in the First Italian War of Independence, fighting in 1848 in the battles of Villafranca, Pastrengo, Santa Lucia, Goito, Governolo, Sommacampagna, Valeggio, Volta Mantovana, and Milan, and in 1849 in the battles of Sforzesca and Novara.

On 3 January 1850 the regiment was reduced to four squadrons, with the Genova's 6th Squadron used to form the depot of the newly formed Regiment "Cavalleggeri di Monferrato". In 1859 the regiment participated in the Second Italian War of Independence and fought with distinction at Vinzaglio. On 16 September 1859 the Genova ceded one of its squadrons to help form the Regiment "Cavalleggeri di Milano" and on 19 October of the same year the regiment was redesignated as Cuirassiers unit and renamed Regiment "Corazzieri di Genova". Already on 6 June 1860 the regiment resumed to use its previous name Regiment "Genova Cavalleria".

In 1866 the regiment participated in the Third Italian War of Independence and fought in the Battle of Custoza, where it checked the Austro-Hungarian advance to allow the infantry divisions "Principe Umberto" and "Bixio", as well as some artillery units, to retreat.

In 1868-70 the regiment operated in Campania to suppress the anti-Sardinian revolt in Southern Italy after the Kingdom of Sardinia had invaded and annexed the Kingdom of Two Sicilies. Over the next years the regiment repeatedly changed its name:

 10 September 1871: 4th Regiment of Cavalry (Genova)
 5 November 1876: Cavalry Regiment "Genova" (4th)
 16 December 1897: Regiment "Genova Cavalleria" (4th)

In 1887 the regiment contributed to the formation of the Mounted Hunters Squadron, which fought in the Italo-Ethiopian War of 1887–1889. In 1895-96 the regiment provided 69 enlisted personnel for units deployed to Italian Eritrea for the First Italo-Ethiopian War. On 1 October 1909 the Genova ceded one of its squadrons to help form new Regiment "Lancieri di Mantova" (25th). In 1911-12 the regiment provided 66 enlisted personnel to augment units fighting in the Italo-Turkish War.

World War I 

At the outbreak of World War I the regiment consisted of a command, the regimental depot, and two cavalry groups, with the I Group consisting of three squadrons and the II Group consisting of two squadrons and a machine gun section. Together with the Regiment "Lancieri di Novara" (5th) the Genova formed the II Cavalry Brigade of the 1st Cavalry Division of "Friuli". The division fought dismounted in the trenches of the Italian Front. In 1916 the regiment was reinforced with the 1st Squadron of the Regiment "Piemonte Reale Cavalleria" (2nd). On 16 September 1916 the regiment conquered and held Hill 144 on the Karst Plateau and the regimental standard was decorated with a Silver Medal for Military Valour. In December 1916 the division was sent to Treviso, mounted on horses again and held in reserve.

In 1917 the regimental depot in Pordenone formed the 733rd Dismounted Machine Gunners Company as reinforcement for infantry units on the front. After the Italian defeat in the Battle of Caporetto the II Cavalry Brigade, together with the II/25th Battalion and III/26th Battalion of the Infantry Brigade "Bergamo", stalled the Austro-Hungarian advance on 30 October 1917 in the Battle of Pozzuolo del Friuli, which allowed the Italian III Army to escape across the Tagliamento river.

In 1918 the regiment fought in the Second Battle of the Piave River. After the Italian victory in the Battle of Vittorio Veneto, the regiment, like all cavalry regiments, was ordered to advance as fast as far as possible and so on 31 October 1918, while pursuing the retreating Austro-Hungarian forces, the regiment secured the bridge over the Livenza at Fiaschetti.

Interwar years 
After the war the Italian Army disbanded 14 of its 30 cavalry regiments and so on 21 November 1919 the II Group of the Genova was renamed "Lancieri di Mantova" as it consisted of personnel and horses from the disbanded Regiment "Lancieri di Mantova" (25th). On 20 May 1920 the Genova received and integrated a squadron of the disbanded Regiment "Lancieri di Milano" (7th), and received the traditions of the Regiment "Lancieri di Mantova" (25th). In 1926 the regiment moved from Pordenone to Bologna and in 1933 from Bologna to Rome.

Second Italo-Ethiopian War 
In June 1935 regiment formed the I and II truck-transported machine gunners groups. Each group fielded three machine gunners squadrons of 120 men and one command squadron of 60 men. The two groups, together with the III and IV groups formed by the Regiment "Lancieri di Aosta" (6th), were deployed to Italian Somaliland for the Second Italo-Ethiopian War. On 20 January 1936 the four groups participated in the conquest of Neghelli. On 1 January 1937 the four groups were given the honor title "Cavalieri di Neghelli" ("Knights of Neghelli"). After their return to Italy in late spring 1937 the I and II truck-mounted machine gunners groups were disbanded.

On 7 April 1939 the regiment's II Squadrons Group, together the I and II platoons of the regiment's 5th Machine Gunners Squadron, participated in the Italian invasion of Albania.

World War II 
At the outbreak of World War II the regiment consisted of a command, a command squadron, the I and II squadrons groups, each with two mounted squadrons, and the 5th Machine Gunners Squadron. In April 1941 the Genova was attached to the 3rd Cavalry Division "Principe Amedeo Duca d'Aosta" for the invasion of Yugoslavia.

In 1942 the regiment operated in Croatia against Yugoslav partisans. Afterwards the regiment returned to Italy, where on 1 August 1942 it joined the 2nd Cavalry Division "Emanuele Filiberto Testa di Ferro". In October 1942 the division returned to occupied Yugoslavia on anti-partisan duty.

The regiment returned to Italy on 3 September 1943 and was in Dronero in Piedmont, when the Armistice of Cassibile was announced on 8 September 1943. While the regiment was quickly overcome and disbanded by the invading Germans, the regiment's depot in Rome organized an ad hoc battle group, which together with the 12th Infantry Division "Sassari", 21st Infantry Division "Granatieri di Sardegna", 135th Armored Cavalry Division "Ariete", and Regiment "Lancieri di Montebello" (8th) defended Rome against the Germans. On 10 September the Italian troops and hundreds of civilians fell back to Porta San Paolo for a last stand. By 17:00 the Germans broke the line of the Italian defenders, who had suffered 570 dead, including two of the Genova's officers: Captain Franco Vannetti Donnini. Soon after the units surrendered to the Germans as the flight of the Italian King Victor Emmanuel III from Rome made further resistance senseless.

During the war the regiment's depot in Rome formed the:
 III Dismounted Group "Genova Cavalleria"
 IV Dismounted Group "Genova Cavalleria"
 IV Machine Gunners Group "Genova Cavalleria"
 X Road Movement Battalion "Genova Cavalleria"
 XIX Dismounted Support Group "Genova Cavalleria"
 XXVII Dismounted Group "Genova Cavalleria"
 XXIX Dismounted Group "Genova Cavalleria"
 XXXIX Machine Gunners Group "Genova Cavalleria"
 LIII Dismounted Group "Genova Cavalleria"
 LIV Dismounted Group "Genova Cavalleria"
 LV Dismounted Group "Genova Cavalleria"

In November 1941 the IV Machine Gunners Group "Genova Cavalleria" was attached to the German Afrika-Division z. b. V. in North Africa, with which it fought in the Western Desert Campaign.

Meanwhile the III and IV dismounted groups were assigned to the Harbor Defense Command Civitavecchia of the 220th Coastal Division, which was responsible for the coastal defense of northern Lazio between the rivers Chiarone and Astura.

The XXVII Dismounted Group "Genova Cavalleria" was at the time of the announcement of the Armistice of Cassibile in Corsica, where it fought together with the 20th Infantry Division "Friuli", 44th Infantry Division "Cremona", 225th Coastal Division, 226th Coastal Division and local resistance units against the German Sturmbrigade Reichführer-SS and 90th Panzergrenadier Division, which were retreating through Corsica to the harbor of Bastia in the island's north. After the Germans had left Corsica the group was transferred to Sardinia and in August 1944 to Bari in Southern Italy, where it was assigned to the Territorial Command of Bari. In January 1945, the XXVII Group "Genova Cavalleria" was attached to the British Eighth Army's 56th Area Command in Siena. In May 1945 the group took part in the liberation of Milan.

Cold War 

On 20 November 1946 the 4th Dragoons Reconnaissance Group was formed in Albenga. In 1947 the group moved from Albenga to Palmanova. On 1 February 1949 the group was expanded to 4th Armored Cavalry Regiment "Genova Cavalleria". The regiment consisted of a command, a command squadron, and three squadrons groups. The same year the regiment provided a mixed squadron for the security corps of the Trust Territory of Somaliland, which was under Italian administration. The deployment of the squadron lasted until 1951 and it consisted of a command platoon, two armored car platoons with Staghound T17, and a tank platoon with Stuart M3A3 tanks. On 1 April 1957 the regiment was assigned to the Cavalry Brigade in Gradisca d'Isonzo and on 4 November 1958 the regiment was renamed Regiment "Genova Cavalleria" (4th).

During the 1975 army reform the army disbanded the regimental level and newly independent battalions were granted for the first time their own flags. On 1 October 1975 the Regiment "Genova Cavalleria" (4th) and its III Squadrons Group in Palmanova were disbanded. The regiment's I Squadrons Group was reorganized and renamed 4th Mechanized Squadrons Group "Genova Cavalleria" and assigned the flag and traditions of the regiment. The squadrons group consisted of a command, a command and services squadron, three mechanized squadrons with M113 armored personnel carriers, and a heavy mortar squadron with M106 mortar carriers with 120mm mod. 63 mortars. The regiment's II Squadrons Group was renamed 28th Tank Squadrons Group "Cavalleggeri di Treviso" and assigned the flag and traditions of the Regiment "Cavalleggeri di Treviso" (28th). Both squadrons groups were part of the Armored Brigade "Pozzuolo del Friuli".

For its conduct and work after the 1976 Friuli earthquake the squadrons group was awarded a Bronze Medal of Army Valour, which was affixed to the battalion's flag and added to the battalion's coat of arms.

Recent times 
On 13 September 1993 the 4th Mechanized Squadrons Group "Genova Cavalleria" lost its autonomy and the next day the squadrons group entered the newly formed Regiment "Genova Cavalleria" (4th). The regiment consisted of a command, a command and services squadron, and a squadrons group with three armored squadrons equipped with wheeled Centauro tank destroyers.

Current structure 
As of 2022 the Regiment "Genova Cavalleria" (4th) consists of:

  Regimental Command, in Palmanova
 Command and Logistic Support Squadron "Quota 144"
 1st Reconnaissance Squadrons Group
 1st Reconnaissance Squadron "Bricchetto"
 2nd Reconnaissance Squadron "Bicocca"
 3rd Reconnaissance Squadron "Pozzuolo del Friuli"
 Heavy Armored Squadron "Buriasco"

The Command and Logistic Support Squadron fields the following platoons: C3 Platoon, Transport and Materiel Platoon, Medical Platoon, and Commissariat Platoon. The three reconnaissance squadrons are equipped with VTLM Lince vehicles and Centauro tank destroyers, the latter of which are scheduled to be replaced by Freccia reconnaissance vehicles. The Heavy Armor Squadron is equipped with Centauro tank destroyers, which are being replaced by Centauro II tank destroyers.

See also 
 Cavalry Brigade "Pozzuolo del Friuli"

External links
 Italian Army Website: Reggimento "Genova Cavalleria" (4°)

References

Military units and formations established in 1683
Military units and formations disestablished in 1943
Military units and formations established in 1946
Cavalry Regiments of Italy